Singju (pronounced sing-zoo) is a dish from Manipur. It originated with the Meitei-culture but has been widely adopted by most of the ethnic communities of the state and in some neighbouring states of Northeast India. Often served as a spicy side dish, it is also a popular as an afternoon or evening snack.

Given that its main ingredient are seasonal vegetables, Singju has many variations. However, there are two main types: Ngari-based and Thoiding-Besan based.
Ngari is a kind of fermented fish, the flavor of which forms the backbone Manipuri cuisine. Roasted Ngari-based Singju is more popular in all homes, however it is not usually sold by local Singju vendors due high cost of Ngari. The Thoiding-Besan version therefore is more widely available from Singju vendors. Thoiding is an oily seed obtained from the plant Perilla frutescens which when roasted gives a nutty flavor. A mixture of roasted thoiding and roasted besan give a delicious flavor that is distinctive to Singju.  This latter non-Ngari version is also served in religious feasts where fish is prohibited.

History 

Manipur, being one of the most ancient independent kingdoms of South Asia, before becoming a part of India in 1949, has many distinctive local customs and traditions, owing to various influences throughout time. The word "Singju" comes from two words - "Manaa-Masing" and "Suba". "Manaa-Masing" means green vegetables and "Suba" means combining. Therefore, in rapid pronunciation the word "Manaa-Masing" drops to "Sing" and the word "Suba" transform to "Ju" for the better pronouncement. As a result, the word, "Singju" was born.

Preparation 

Singju is a versatile dish that may be made vegetarian or non-vegetarian. There are two distinct ways to prepare singju.

Veggie Singju 
A veggie singju is mainly served in ritual feasts of the Meitei people which are observed at home courtyards or shrine yards, or community complexes. It can be eaten at family homes too, but typically people prefer the non-veg versions in a non-ritual context.

In this form of the dish, the main ingredients are perilla seeds (thoiding in Meitei), chanaa powder, salt, chillies and various green leafy vegetables (compatible vegetables are listed below).

Non-veg Singju 
A non-veg version of singju is mainly eaten at home, and widely sold in restaurants all over Manipur, and in some other areas of India as well. The tag "non-veg" is because of the use of the fermented fish ingredient Ngari. Because of this, it can not be served at ritual feasts of the community, which must be vegetarian.

In this type, the main ingredients are Ngari (a Manipuri form of fermented fish), salt, chillies and green leafy vegetables (compatible vegetables' list are listed below).

Common Singju Vegetable Ingredients 
Any vegetable can be used to make singju, but some are more popular than others. 
Popular additions include:

 Lotus stem (Thambou in Meitei)
 Stink Bean (Yongchaak)
 Cabbage (Kobiful)
 Cauliflower (Kobi-Lei)
 Hawai Debi or Tebi
 Hawai Maton
 Unripe Papaya (Awaa Thabi)
 Banana Flower (Laphu Tharo)
 Rice Bean (Chakhawai)
 Onion (Tilhou)

Morok Metpa or Ametpa 

Morok Metpa or Ametpa is another singju like dish. Morok means chilli and Metpa/Ametpa meaning crush. It is traditionally eaten along with daily meals at home but are not served at rituals. Like singju, it can be prepared in two ways, veg and non-veg, the former is usually eaten during the mourning period until the shraddha ceremony (for Meiteis) or the janazah ceremony (for Pangals) or after the burial ceremony (for Meitei Christians) or on days when people skip any type of fish/meat due to religious beliefs. It is usually made by frying red chillies, chives and onions as opposed to the usual steamed or roasted fermented fish and chillies eaten every day.

See also 
Manipuri cuisine
Eromba

References

Indian cuisine
Salads
Manipuri cuisine